Émilie Guerel (born 18 December 1983) is a French politician of La République En Marche! (LREM) who served as a member of the French National Assembly from 2017 to 2022, representing the 7th constituency in the department of Var.

In parliament, Guerel served as member of the Committee on Legal Affairs. In this capacity, she was the parliament's co-rapporteur (alongside Marianne Dubois) on the introduction of the General National Service (SNU) in 2018.

See also
 2017 French legislative election

References

1983 births
Living people
People from Carpentras
Deputies of the 15th National Assembly of the French Fifth Republic
La République En Marche! politicians
21st-century French women politicians
Women members of the National Assembly (France)